Kemsing Down is a   nature reserve north of Sevenoaks in Kent. It is managed by the Kent Wildlife Trust. It is in the Kent Downs Area of Outstanding Natural Beauty.

Habitats in this downland site include ancient and secondary woodland, scrub and chalk grassland. There are man, pyramidal and common spotted orchids, and butterflies include the brown argus and grizzled skipper.

There is access by a footpath from Pilgrims Way.

References

Kent Wildlife Trust